Francis Busungu (born 10 April 1991) is a Tanzanian football striker.

References

1991 births
Living people
Tanzanian footballers
Tanzania international footballers
Coastal Union F.C. players
Polisi FC players
Kagera Sugar F.C. players
Young Africans S.C. players
Lipuli F.C. players
Association football forwards
Tanzanian Premier League players